Electric Picnic 2014 was the eleventh edition of the Electric Picnic festival to take place. The three-day event took take place on the weekend of Friday 29, Saturday 30 and Sunday 31 September at Stradbally Hall in Stradbally, County Laois, Ireland. The festival featured 42 stages with headliners like OutKast, Blondie, Beck and Paolo Nutini. The festival was attended by 41,000 people.

References

External links
 Official website

2014 in Irish music